Leon Dajaku (born 12 April 2001) is a German professional footballer who plays as a winger and forward for Swiss Super League club St. Gallen, on loan from Sunderland.

Club career

VfB Stuttgart
Dajaku began his youth career with Spvgg Rommelshausen and FSV Waiblingen, before moving to the youth team of VfB Stuttgart in 2014.

Dajaku made his professional debut for VfB Stuttgart in the Bundesliga on 9 December 2018, coming on as a substitute in the 75th minute for Anastasios Donis in the 0–3 away loss against Borussia Mönchengladbach.

Bayern Munich
On 16 July 2019, Dajaku joined Bayern Munich on a four-year contract. He was subsequently assigned to the reserve team in the 3. Liga. On 21 December 2019, he made his first team debut in a Bundesliga 2–0 home win against VfL Wolfsburg.

Loan to Union Berlin
On 16 January 2021, Dajaku signed a six-month loan deal with Union Berlin with the option to purchase.

Union Berlin

On 31 August 2021, Union Berlin activated the purchase clause in the loan agreement for Dajaku.  The fee was rumoured to be €1 million.

Sunderland AFC
On 31 August 2021, Dajaku signed a season-long loan deal with EFL League 1 club Sunderland AFC. He scored his first goal for Sunderland against Cheltenham Town on 28 September 2021.

Following the loan, Dajaku moved to Sunderland on a permanent basis in June 2022 and signed a two-year contract.

On 26 January 2023, Dajaku joined Swiss Super League club St. Gallen on loan until the end of the season.

International career
Dajaku was included in Germany's squad for the 2018 edition of the UEFA European Under-17 Championship in England, where he scored twice in the 3–0 win against Serbia. However, the German team was eliminated in the group stage.

Personal life
Dajaku was born in Waiblingen, Germany to Kosovo Albanian parents from Skenderaj.

Career statistics

Club

Honours

Bayern Munich
 Bundesliga: 2019–20
 DFB-Pokal:  2019–20
Sunderland
 EFL League One play-offs: 2022

References

External links
 
 Profile at DFB.de
 Profile at kicker.de

2001 births
Living people
People from Waiblingen
Sportspeople from Stuttgart (region)
Footballers from Baden-Württemberg
Association football forwards
German footballers
Germany youth international footballers
German people of Kosovan descent
VfB Stuttgart players
VfB Stuttgart II players
FC Bayern Munich footballers
FC Bayern Munich II players
1. FC Union Berlin players
Sunderland A.F.C. players
FC St. Gallen players
Bundesliga players
3. Liga players
Regionalliga players
English Football League players
German people of Albanian descent
German expatriate footballers
Expatriate footballers in England
German expatriate sportspeople in England
Expatriate footballers in Switzerland
German expatriate sportspeople in Switzerland